is the 14th single from Japanese pop singer Kaela Kimura.

Track listing

References

2009 singles
Kaela Kimura songs
Japanese-language songs
2009 songs